Anette Norberg (born 12 November 1966) is a retired Swedish curler from Härnösand.

She and her team were the Olympic women's curling champions in 2006 and 2010. After winning the 2006 Women's Curling tournament in Turin over Mirjam Ott's Swiss team, she led her team to victory for gold over Cheryl Bernard's Canadian team in the 2010 Women's Curling tournament in Vancouver; becoming the first skip in the history of curling to successfully defend an Olympic title.

Her team that retired after the 2010 Olympics (although she herself continued until 2013) is regarded as one of the best women's curling teams in history, and she is often regarded as one of the best female skips in history, particularly after adding yet another world title in 2011 with a new younger team.

Career
Norberg started to curl at the age of ten.

Norberg won seven European Curling Championships (and ) and three World Curling Championships (2005, 2006 and 2011). She also won silver medal at the 2001 Ford World Curling Championship and bronze medals in 1988, 1989, 1991 and 2003 World Championships. Except when she played at third for Elisabeth Högström in the team that won the 1988 European Championship, Norberg has always played the position of skip. After the retirement of her Olympic team, she put together a new team, with Cecilia Östlund, Sara Carlsson, and Liselotta Lennartsson and won her final third world championship gold medal. Norberg announced her decision to retire in April 2013.

In 1989 she was inducted into the Swedish Curling Hall of Fame. In 2021, she and her Olympic team mates were inducted into the WCF Hall of Fame.

Personal life
Apart from curling, Norberg was chief actuary at Nordea, and led a division at Folksam. She is currently a consultant at PricewaterhouseCoopers.

Norberg holds a Bachelor of Arts in mathematics from Uppsala University. She has one daughter, curler Therese Westman, and one son, singer Tobias Westman. In September 2014, Norberg revealed that she had been diagnosed with breast cancer in 2013, shortly after she retired. She has since completed treatment, which included chemotherapy and surgery to remove the tumor.

In 2006, Norberg appeared in the "Hearts on Fire" music video for Swedish power metal band HammerFall.

Norberg appeared as a contestant in Let's Dance 2013.

Teams

References

External links

 Anette Norberg Swedish Olympic Committee (web archive)
 Norberg forms new team

Living people
1966 births
People from Härnösand
Swedish female curlers
Olympic curlers of Sweden
Olympic medalists in curling
Olympic gold medalists for Sweden
Olympic silver medalists for Sweden
Curlers at the 1988 Winter Olympics
Curlers at the 1992 Winter Olympics
Curlers at the 2006 Winter Olympics
Curlers at the 2010 Winter Olympics
Medalists at the 1988 Winter Olympics
Medalists at the 2010 Winter Olympics
Medalists at the 2006 Winter Olympics
World curling champions
European curling champions
Swedish curling champions
Continental Cup of Curling participants
Swedish actuaries